Spencer Township is an inactive township in Ralls County, in the U.S. state of Missouri.

Spencer Township was erected in 1821, taking its name from Spencer Creek.

References

Townships in Missouri
Townships in Ralls County, Missouri